Anna Ploszajski (born 1991) is a materials scientist, engineer, and writer. Her book, Handmade: A Scientist's Search for Meaning Through Making, was published by Bloomsbury Publishing on 18 May 2021.

Education
Ploszajski attended Dame Alice Harpur School (now part of Bedford Girls' School) choosing to study A-Level mathematics, further mathematics, physics and music. She went on to study at Mansfield College, Oxford.

Awards
In 2017 she was named Young Engineer of the Year by the Royal Academy of Engineering, and in 2018 won the Silver Medal from the Institute of Materials, Minerals and Mining.

References

People educated at Dame Alice Harpur School
People associated with University College London
Alumni of Mansfield College, Oxford
1991 births
Living people